This is a list of bridges and tunnels on the National Register of Historic Places in the U.S. state of Iowa.

References

 
Iowa
Bridges
Bridges